Who He? (also published as The Rat Race) is a non-science-fiction novel by the science fiction author Alfred Bester, published in 1953.  The book was republished in 2007 and as of 2015 is available for purchase from Wildside Press. It provides a detailed if somewhat madcap view of the early days of television production in New York City before most tv production moved west to California.

Plot summary

A TV game show writer, waking up after an alcoholic blackout, discovers that someone is out to destroy his life.

Reception
Groff Conklin in 1954 advised readers of Galaxy to not miss "Bester's savage picture of television production".

References

External links
http://www.fantasticfiction.co.uk/b/alfred-bester/who-he.htm
  

1953 American novels
American satirical novels
Novels by Alfred Bester